North Carolina's 19th Senate district is one of 50 districts in the North Carolina Senate. It has been represented by Democrat Val Applewhite since 2023.

Geography
Since 2013, the district has included part of Cumberland County. The district overlaps with the 43rd, 44th, and 45th state house districts.

District officeholders

Election results

2022

2020

2018

2016

2014

2012

2010

2008

2006

2004

2002

2000

References

North Carolina Senate districts
Cumberland County, North Carolina